Northwoods Mall may refer to:
Northwoods Mall (Peoria, Illinois)
Northwoods Mall (North Charleston, South Carolina)